The 1998–99 Czech Cup was the fifth season of the annual football knock-out tournament of the Czech Republic. Winners Jablonec qualified for the 1998–99 UEFA Cup Winners' Cup.

Teams

Preliminary round
44 teams took part in the preliminary round.

|}

Round 1
74 teams entered the competition at this stage. Along with the 22 winners from the preliminary round, these teams played 48 matches to qualify for the second round.

|}

Round 2

|}

Round 3

|}

Round 4
The fourth round was played on 7 and 8 April 1998.

|}

Quarterfinals
The quarterfinals were played on 29 April 1998.

|}

Semifinals
The semifinals were played on 5 and 6 May 1998.

|}

Final

See also
 1997–98 Czech First League
 1997–98 Czech 2. Liga

References

External links
 Official site 
 Czech Republic Cup 1997/98 at RSSSF.com

1997–98
1997–98 domestic association football cups
Cup